Nelsinho may refer to:

Nelsinho Baptista (born 1950), former Brazilian football right back.
Nelson Piquet Jr. (born 1985), Brazilian racing driver, son of Nelson Piquet.
Nelsinho (footballer, born 1979), Portuguese footballer.
Nelsinho (footballer, born 1988), Brazilian footballer